El Plantío is a ward (barrio) of Madrid belonging to the district of Moncloa-Aravaca.

The Colegio Japonés de Madrid, a Japanese international school, is in El Plantío.

References

Wards of Madrid
Moncloa-Aravaca